The Sarsuti river, originating in Sivalik Hills and flowing through the palaeochannel of Yamuna, is a tributary of Ghaggar river in of Haryana state of India. Its course is dotted with archaeological and religious sites dating back to post-Harrapan Mahabharata sites from Vedic period, such as Kapal Mochan, Kurukshetra, Thanesar, Brahma Sarovar, Jyotisar, Bhor Saidan and Pehowa.

Origin and route
The Sarsuti is a small ephemeral stream that rises in the Sivalik Hills of south-eastern Himachal Pradesh in India, and flows through Haryana. It is palaeochannel of Yamuna  before Yamuna shifted towards east due to plate tectonics of earth's crust. It has also been identified as one of the tributaries of Sarasvati River.

It flows south-east where it is joined by two other streams, the Markanda river and the Dangri, before joining the Ghaggar river near the village of Rasula [near Pehowa].

It is thereafter known as the Ghaggar. Further downstream on the banks of the Ghaggar stands an old derelict fort [at sirsa city] named Sarsuti.

According to Valdiya and Danino, Sarsuti is a corruption of the word Sarasvati, and the 6–8 km wide channel of the Sarsuti–Ghaggar system may have once been the Sarasvati River mentioned in the Rig Veda.

See also 

 Western Yamuna Canal, branches off Yamuna
 Markanda river, Haryana, a tributary of Sarsuti
 Dangri river, a tributary of Sarsuti 
 Kaushalya river, a tributary of Ghaggar-Hakra River
 Chautang, a tributary of Ghaggar-Hakra River
 Sutlej, a tributary of Indus
 Ganges
 Indus

References

External links 

Sarasvati-Sindhu civilization and Sarasvati River 
The Saraswati: Where lies the mystery by Saswati Paik

Rivers of Himachal Pradesh
Rivers of Haryana
Rivers of Punjab, India
Rigvedic rivers
Indus basin
International rivers of Asia
Sarasvati River
Rivers of India